Sierra County is the name of two counties in the United States:

 Sierra County, California
 Sierra County, New Mexico